Eriston, or Eristus or Eristos (Ἠρίστῳς), was an ancient inland town on the island of Tenos. It is mentioned in ancient inscriptions.

Its site is unlocated, but may be the same as Come.

References

Populated places in the ancient Aegean islands
Former populated places in Greece
Tinos